Okoboji Community School District (OCSD) is a rural public school district headquartered in Milford, Iowa. It operates Okoboji Elementary School (Milford), Okoboji Middle School (Arnolds Park), and Okoboji High School (Milford).

The logo of the district is the pioneer and is used to show the district giving direction to its pupils.

The district is mostly in Dickinson County with a portion in Clay County. It serves Milford, Arnolds Park, most of Fostoria, most of Okoboji, Wahpeton, and West Okoboji.

History
The district was established on July 1, 1988, by the merger of the Arnolds Park and Milford school districts.

In 2018, the district proposed a $25 million bond for rebuilding its middle school facility.

Schools
The district operates three schools:
 Okoboji Elementary School, Milford
 Okoboji Middle School, Arnolds Park
 Okoboji High School, Milford

See also
List of school districts in Iowa

References

External links
 Okoboji Community School District
School districts in Iowa
Education in Dickinson County, Iowa
Education in Clay County, Iowa
1988 establishments in Iowa
School districts established in 1988